The following is a list of radio stations in the Czech Republic.

List of radios 
 Český rozhlas or ČRo is the state public radio broadcaster of the Czech Republic.
ČRo 1 - Radiožurnál (pop music, news and information)
ČRo 2 - Dvojka (talk and family programmes)
ČRo 3 - Vltava (culture, art and classical music)
ČRo 4 - Radio Wave (youth radio via cable, digital, and internet only)
ČRo 5 - Region (regional radio with 14 regional channels)
ČRo Ostrava
ČRo Olomouc
ČRo Zlín
ČRo Brno
ČRo Vysočina
ČRo Pardubice
ČRo Hradec Králové
ČRo České Budějovice
ČRo Sever
ČRo Liberec
ČRo Plzeň
ČRo Karlovy Vary
ČRo Region
ČRo Regina DAB Praha
ČRo 6 - Plus (spoken radio)
ČRo 7 - Radio Prague International  (external broadcasts in six languages)
ČRo Jazz - Jazz station
ČRo D-Dur 
ČRo Retro - historical radio programmes from archive
ČRo Rádio Junior - Radio for children
ČRo Rádio Junior písničky - songs for kids

BBC World Service
 Classic FM
 Country Radio
 Evropa 2
 Fajn Radio
 Frekvence 1
 Hitrádio Dragon
 Hitrádio Faktor
 Hitrádio FM
 Hitrádio Orion
 Radio 1 Praha
 Radio Beat
 Rádio Blaník
 Radio Čas
 Radio Čas Rock
 Radio Černá Hora
 Radio Impuls
 Rádio Český Impuls
 Radio Proglas
 Radio Kiss
 Rock Radio Gold
 RockZone 105.9

See also
 Czech Radio
 List of radio stations in Europe
 (Czech) RadioTV.cz | List of radio stations
 (English) FMscan.org | Full list of Czech radio stations

References

Czech Republic